Éderson Alves Ribeiro Silva (born 13 March 1989 in Pentecoste), simply known as Éderson, is a Brazilian footballer who plays as a striker. During the 2013 season, he scored 21 goals out of 36 Série A games which made him the league top scorer.

Honours

Club
ABC
Campeonato Brasileiro Série C: 2010
Campeonato Potiguar: 2011

Ceará
Campeonato Cearense: 2012

Individual
 Campeonato Brasileiro Série A Top Goalscorer: 2013
 Campeonato Brasileiro Série A Team of the Year: 2013

References

External links

1989 births
Living people
Brazilian footballers
Association football forwards
Campeonato Brasileiro Série A players
Campeonato Brasileiro Série B players
Campeonato Brasileiro Série C players
Campeonato Brasileiro Série D players
Club Athletico Paranaense players
Ceará Sporting Club players
ABC Futebol Clube players
CR Vasco da Gama players
Fortaleza Esporte Clube players
Botafogo Futebol Clube (PB) players
Associação Chapecoense de Futebol players
Esporte Clube São Luiz players
UAE Pro League players
Al-Wasl F.C. players
J1 League players
Kashiwa Reysol players
Brazilian expatriate footballers
Expatriate footballers in the United Arab Emirates
Expatriate footballers in Japan
Sportspeople from Ceará